Centreville is a town in Amite and Wilkinson counties, Mississippi, United States. It is part of the McComb, Mississippi micropolitan statistical area. Its population was 1,258 in 2020.

Bethany Presbyterian Church is a historic church in Centreville, built in 1855, and added to the National Register of Historic Places in 2003.

The town was incorporated in 1880, and it was a small settlement in the years prior. In 1880, the Yazoo and Mississippi Valley R.R. ran along the border between Wilkinson and Amite counties. Because the station was approximately midway between Liberty and Woodville and about midway between Natchez and Baton Rouge, it was appropriately named Centreville.

Geography
Centreville is located within Wilkinson County, with a portion in adjacent Amite County. In the 2000 census, 1,433 of the town's 1,680 residents (85.3%) lived in Wilkinson County and 247 (14.7%) in Amite County.

According to the United States Census Bureau, the town has a total area of 2.3 square miles (6.0 km2), all land.

Demographics

According to the 2020 United States census, there were 1,258 people, 724 households, and 374 families residing in the town; the racial and ethnic composition of the town was 71.3% Black and African American, 25.6% non-Hispanic white, 0.24% Native American, 0.08% Asian, 2.31% multiracial or of another race/ethnicity, and 0.48% Hispanic or Latino of any race in 2020. According to the 2020 American Community Survey, its median household income was $30,682.

Education

Public schools
Most of Centreville is served by the Wilkinson County School District, although the portion that lies in Amite County is served by the Amite County School District.

Private schools
 Centreville Academy

Notable people

 Robert P. Briscoe, World War II Navy Cross recipient and US Navy four-star Admiral
 William A. Dickson, U.S. Representative from 1909-1913
 Girault M. Jones, seventh Bishop of Louisiana in The Episcopal Church
 John N. Kennedy, United States Senator from Louisiana
 Albert Lewis, Hall of Fame member of the Kansas City Chiefs; retired to a ranch in Centreville.
 Anne Moody, civil rights activist and author of Coming of Age in Mississippi
 Melanie Sojourner, member of the Mississippi State Senate
 Louis Leon Thurstone, psychologist 
 Kevin Windham, pro motocross, supercross racer

References

Towns in Amite County, Mississippi
Towns in Wilkinson County, Mississippi
Towns in Mississippi
Towns in McComb micropolitan area